The mean speed theorem, also known as the Merton rule of uniform acceleration, was discovered in the 14th century by the Oxford Calculators of Merton College, and was proved by Nicole Oresme. It states that a uniformly accelerated body (starting from rest, i.e. zero initial velocity) travels the same distance as a body with uniform speed whose speed is half the final velocity of the accelerated body.

Details
Clay tablets used in Babylonian astronomy (350–50 BC) present trapezoid procedures for computing Jupiter's position and motion and anticipate the theorem by 14 centuries.

The medieval scientists demonstrated this theorem—the foundation of "the law of falling bodies"—long before Galileo, who is generally credited with it. Oresme's proof is also the first known example of the modelization of a physical problem as a mathematical function with a graphical representation, as well as of an early form of integration, thus laying the foundation of calculus. The mathematical physicist and historian of science Clifford Truesdell, wrote:

The theorem is a special case of the more general kinematics equations for uniform acceleration.

See also
 Science in the Middle Ages
 Scholasticism

Notes

Further reading 
 Sylla, Edith (1982) "The Oxford Calculators", in Kretzmann, Kenny & Pinborg (edd.), The Cambridge History of Later Medieval Philosophy.
 Longeway, John (2003) "William Heytesbury", in The Stanford Encyclopedia of Philosophy.

History of philosophy
Merton College, Oxford
History of the University of Oxford
14th century in science
Classical mechanics